Keon Alexander, also known as Keon Mohajeri, is a Canadian actor best known for his television roles as Marco Inaros in The Expanse, Rami Said in Tyrant and Dominick Baptiste in Impulse.

Biography
Alexander is of Persian heritage. His early roles included a guest appearance in an episode of Flashpoint (2009) and a six-episode stint in the television adaptation of Bloodletting & Miraculous Cures (2010), playing the part of Sri. This was followed by his first film role in Circumstance (2011), which won the Audience Award: Dramatic at the 2011 Sundance Film Festival and was ranked one of the 50 best movies of 2011 by Paste magazine.

Keon was named one of Canada's Rising Stars by the Toronto International Film Festival in 2011.

Over the next few years, Alexander appeared in many TV series—including Murdoch Mysteries (2012), Republic of Doyle (2012), Legends (2014), and Remedy (2015)—before landing the Recurring Role of Rami Said in FX's Tyrant, in which he appeared in the second and third Seasons from 2015 to 2016.

Alexander has had recurring roles as Dominick Baptiste in the television series Impulse (2018) and as Marco Inaros in the science fiction series The Expanse. As of season 5, he became a series regular on The Expanse.

Filmography

References

External links 

21st-century Canadian male actors
Canadian male film actors
Canadian male television actors
Living people
Year of birth missing (living people)